Ann Howard born Ann Pauline Swadling (22 July 1934 – 26 March 2014) was an English mezzo-soprano known particularly for portraying Carmen.

Life
Howard was born in Streatham, London. Her father, William Alfred Swadling, was an electrical engineer and her mother was Winifred, née Howell. She left school aged 15 and went to work as an assistant in a jewellery shop, later moving to Garrard & Co, jewellers, which had its own operatic group. In her spare time she took singing lessons with Topliss Green and Rodolpha Lhombino. She was able to resign from shop work when she was offered a position touring, appearing in musicals and pantomimes.

She reputedly had only seen one opera when she successfully auditioned for the chorus of the Royal Opera in London in 1960, and won a scholarship to study with Dominique Modesti in Paris. After singing minor roles at Covent Garden, she joined Sadler's Wells Opera as a principal, continuing to appear with them after they became the English National Opera in 1974. Her appearances with other companies included Scottish Opera, where she sung Fricka in Wagner's Die Walküre, a role she reprised in Reginald Goodall's 1973 Ring Cycle.

Howard's performance as Carmen in 1970 brought her fame. By 1984 she had sung the role more than 250 times, including appearing with Plácido Domingo in the United States. After 1984 she concentrated on character roles of the kind she described as 'witches and bitches', including the old crone in Humperdinck's Hansel and Gretel and Delilah in Saint-Saëns's Samson and Delilah. She also worked beyond opera, recording The Arcadians in 1968 and appearing in Sondheim's Into the Woods in the West End of London in 1990. The following year she appeared alongside Eric Idle at the Royal Variety Performance in a rendition of Always Look on the Bright Side of Life. She retired from the stage in 1999, but continued to teach young singers.

On 20 March 1954, she married pianist Keith Desmond Giles and they had one daughter together.

Howard died aged 79 at home in Surbiton, Surrey, on 26 March 2014 as a result of a pulmonary embolism and deep-vein thrombosis.

References

1934 births
2014 deaths
People from Streatham
English mezzo-sopranos